The Ionia Mayors were a Central League baseball team based in Ionia, Michigan, United States that existed for part of the 1921 season and in 1922. They were the only professional baseball team to play in Ionia. Notable players include outfielder Fred Kommers, pitcher Phil Slattery, catcher Buck Crouse, and shortstop Davey Claire.

References

Baseball teams established in 1921
Defunct minor league baseball teams
Sports clubs disestablished in 1922
1921 establishments in Michigan
1922 disestablishments in Michigan
Defunct baseball teams in Michigan
Central League teams
Baseball teams disestablished in 1922